The 1993–94 Oklahoma State Cowboys basketball team represented Oklahoma State University as a member of the Big Eight Conference during the 1993–94 NCAA Division I men's basketball season. The team was led by fourth-year head coach Eddie Sutton and played their home games at Gallagher-Iba Arena. The Cowboys finished with a record of 24–10 (10–4 Big Eight) and earned a second place finish in Big Eight regular season play.

Oklahoma State received an at-large bid to the NCAA tournament as No. 4 seed in the Midwest region. After defeating New Mexico State in the opening round, the Cowboys were defeated by Tulsa, 82–80.

Roster

Source:

Schedule and results

|-
!colspan=9 style=| Regular Season

|-
!colspan=9 style=| Big Eight Tournament

|-
!colspan=9 style=| NCAA tournament

Rankings

References

Oklahoma State Cowboys basketball seasons
Oklahoma State
1993 in sports in Oklahoma
1994 in sports in Oklahoma
Oklahoma State